Friend of a Friend may refer to:

 Friend of a friend, a human contact that exists because of a mutual friend
 FOAF, machine-readable ontology describing people, their activities, and relations to others

Music 
 "Friend of a Friend" (Foo Fighters song), 1992, and later releases
 "Friend of a Friend" (Lake Malawi song), 2019
 "Friend of a Friend", a 2013 song by Tim McGraw on the album Two Lanes of Freedom
 "Friend of a Friend", a 2016 song by Weezer on Weezer (White Album)